U.S. Città di Palermo played the 2013–14 football season in Serie B, the first appearance in the second tier after relegation in the 2012–13 Serie A season following nine consecutive seasons in the top flight. The season ended with the club ensuring direct promotion back to Serie A at its first attempt.

Review and events

After completing the 2012–13 Serie A season in 18th place and being thus relegated into Serie B, club chairman Maurizio Zamparini announced the confirmation of Giorgio Perinetti as director of football and also stated his intention to keep Giuseppe Sannino as head coach in order to set an immediate attempt to return to the top flight. However, an agreement was not found between Sannino (who ultimately left Palermo to accept a head coaching role at Serie A's Chievo) and the rosanero club, and a search for a new head coach was started. Such search ended with the appointment of Gennaro Gattuso as new head coach; a former international midfielder, 2006 FIFA World Cup winner with Italy and UEFA Champions League winner with Milan among all things, Gattuso had only a short player-coach stint at FC Sion in the previous season in terms of managerial experience and his choice was hailed with surprise.

This was followed by Palermo's first summer signing, Northern Ireland international striker Kyle Lafferty from Gattuso's former team FC Sion. Another signing, deep-lying forward Davide Di Gennaro from Spezia, was announced on 1 July. The following day, the club announced to have sold half of Jasmin Kurtić's transfer rights to Sassuolo, with winger Gennaro Troianello coming to Sicily as part of the same deal.

Palermo also acquired the full ownerships of players Anselmo - who was then released after being deemed surplus to requirements - and Eros Pisano, who were both co-owned with Genoa. On the other hand, club captain Fabrizio Miccoli left the club at the expiration of his contract. Another star player, Josip Iličić, also left to join Fiorentina in July.

The club's pre-season camp was held at Sankt Lambrecht and Bad Kleinkirchheim, Austria from 12 July to 4 August.

On 6 August, the club formalized the appointment of former rosanero striker Igor Budan as team manager. The same day, Nicola Amoruso tended his resignation from his position as Palermo's director of football citing personal reasons.

Palermo made its season debut in the Coppa Italia with a 2–1 home win against Lega Pro Prima Divisione club Cremonese, but were eliminated in the following round by newly promoted top-flight club Hellas Verona, who won at Stadio Renzo Barbera thanks to a goal from former rosanero Luca Toni. Serie B debut match, away at Modena, ended in a 1–1 draw, and was followed by a shocking 1–2 home loss at the hands of Empoli, immediately raising doubts about the team's ability to adapt at new life in the second division. This was however immediately followed by the team's first win of the league, a 3–0 away success against Padova thanks to a brace from Abel Hernández. Two consecutive away defeats to Bari and Spezia however damaged Gattuso's position, and led to his ultimate sacking on 25 September and his immediate replacement with the more experienced Giuseppe Iachini. In his debut, Iachini easily defeated S.S. Juve Stabia by a clear 3–0 result. Under Iachini's tenure, results improved dramatically and Palermo ended the first half of the season topping the league. During the January 2014 window, the club was further strengthened by the signings of promising youngster Achraf Lazaar and veteran playmaker Enzo Maresca, as well as the addition of Franco Vázquez, who was previously left out of the squad under Gattuso. Also thanks to these additions, Palermo established as the main force in the league and spent the whole 2014 on top of the league, reaching up to a 13-point advantage to second-placed Latina in April.

On 3 May 2014, after a 1–0 win at Novara, Palermo were mathematically crowned Serie B champions in advance of five league weeks, a Serie B record, and promptly finalized their top flight return after only one season.

Confirmed summer transfer market bids
In

Out

Out on loan

Confirmed winter transfer market bids
In

Out

Out on loan

Staff

Managerial staff

Coaching staff

Squad information
Full season statistics

|-
|colspan="10"|Players sold or loaned out during the winter transfer market:

|}

References

2013-14
Italian football clubs 2013–14 season